Fred José Dembi (born 21 February 1995) is a Congolese professional footballer who plays as a midfielder for Red Star and the Congo national team.

Club career
Dembi is a youth product of AS Madrillet Château Blanc and Quevilly, and began his career with Quevilly in 2014. He followed that up with stints at the reserves of Le Havre and Avranches, followed with an amateur stint with Déville Maromme. In the summer of 2018, he moved to Rouen, and his second season was cut short by the COVID-19 epidemic. For the 2020–21 season, he moved to Cholet. He then joined Orléans in the Championnat National the following season. On 27 May 2022, he transferred to Red Star.

International career
Dembi was born in the Republic of the Congo, and moved to France at the age of 2. He was called up to the Congo national team for a set of 2023 Africa Cup of Nations qualification matches in June 2022. That window he made his debut with the Congo in a 1–0 win over the Gambia on 8 June 2022.

Honours
Déville Maromme
Régional 1: 2017–2018

Rouen
Championnat National 3: 2018–19

References

External links
 
 

1995 births
Living people
People from Pointe-Noire
Republic of the Congo footballers
Republic of the Congo international footballers
Association football midfielders
US Quevilly-Rouen Métropole players
Le Havre AC players
US Avranches players
FC Rouen players
SO Cholet players
US Orléans players
Red Star F.C. players
Championnat National players
Championnat National 2 players
Championnat National 3 players
Republic of the Congo expatriate footballers
Republic of the Congo expatriate sportspeople in France
Expatriate footballers in France